1-Naphthol, or α-naphthol, is a fluorescent organic compound with the formula .  It is a white solid. It is an isomer of 2-naphthol differing by the location of the hydroxyl group on the naphthalene ring. The naphthols are naphthalene homologues of phenol, with the hydroxyl group being more reactive than in the phenols. Both isomers are soluble in simple alcohols, ethers, and chloroform. They are precursors to a variety of useful compounds. Naphthols (both 1 and 2 isomers) are used as biomarkers for livestock and humans exposed to polycyclic aromatic hydrocarbons.

Production
1-Naphthol is prepared by two main routes.  In one method, naphthalene is nitrated to give 1-nitronaphthalene, which is hydrogenated to the amine followed by hydrolysis:
 
 
 

Alternatively, naphthalene is hydrogenated to tetralin, which is oxidized to 1-tetralone, which undergoes dehydrogenation.

Reactions and degradation
Some reactions of 1-naphthol are explicable with reference to its tautomerism, which produces a small amount of the keto tautomer.

One consequence of this tautomerism is the Bucherer reaction, the ammonolysis of 1-naphthol to give 1-aminonaphthalene.

1-Naphthol  biodegrades via formation of 1-naphthol-3,4-oxide, which converts to 1,4-naphthoquinone.

The 4-position of 1-naphthol is susceptible to electrophilic attack.  This regioselective reaction is exploited in the preparation of diazo dyes, which are form using diazonium salts.  Reduction of the diazo derivatives gives 4-amino-1-naphthol.

Partial reduction of 1-naphthol gives the tetrahydro derivative, leaving intact the phenol ring. Full hydrogenation is catalyzed by rhodium.

Applications and occurrence
1-Naphthol is a precursor to a variety of insecticides including carbaryl and pharmaceuticals including nadolol as well as for the antidepressant sertraline and the anti-protozoan therapeutic atovaquone.  It undergoes azo coupling to give various azo dyes, but these are generally less useful than those derived from 2-naphthol.

1-Naphthol is a metabolite of the insecticide carbaryl and naphthalene. Along with TCPy, it has been shown to decrease testosterone levels in adult men.

Other uses
1-Naphthol is used in each of the following chemical tests:
 Molisch's test gives a red- or purple-colored compound to indicate the presence of carbohydrate.
 rapid furfural test turns purple quickly (<30s) if fructose is present, distinguishing it from glucose.
 Sakaguchi test turns red to indicate the presence of arginine in proteins.
 Voges–Proskauer test changes color from yellow to red to indicate that glucose is being broken down into acetoin which is used by bacteria for external energy storage.

References

External links
NIST Chemistry WebBook 1-Naphthalenol

 
1-Naphthyl compounds